Benjamin "Ben" Guidugli (born October 22, 1987) is a former American football fullback. He was signed by the St. Louis Rams as an undrafted free agent in 2011. He played college football for the University of Cincinnati.

Professional career

St. Louis Rams
On July 28, 2011, Guidugli was signed as an undrafted free agent by the St. Louis Rams.

New York Giants
On August 13, 2013, Guidugli was signed by the New York Giants to replace fullback Ryan D'Imperio, who decided to retire from the NFL. On August 25, 2013, he was cut by the Giants.

Personal life
Guidugli's brothers, Gino, Jeff and Tony, played college football at Cincinnati, Southeastern Louisiana and Georgia Military College, respectively.

References

External links
Cincinnati Bearcats bio
St. Louis Rams bio

1987 births
Living people
People from Fort Thomas, Kentucky
Players of American football from Kentucky
American football tight ends
Cincinnati Bearcats football players
St. Louis Rams players
New York Giants players